The black-bellied malkoha (Phaenicophaeus diardi) is a species of malkoha in the family Cuculidae. It is found in Brunei, Indonesia, Malaysia, Myanmar, Singapore, and Thailand. Its natural habitats are subtropical or tropical moist lowland forests and subtropical or tropical mangrove forests. It is threatened by habitat loss.

References

black-bellied malkoha
Birds of Malesia
black-bellied malkoha
Taxonomy articles created by Polbot